Darmarjan (also Romanized as Dārmarjān) is a village in Bask-e Kuleseh Rural District, in the Central District of Sardasht County, West Azerbaijan Province, Iran. At the 2006 census, its population was 39, in 7 families.

References 

Populated places in Sardasht County